Douglas Kyle (born July 22, 1932, in Toronto, Ontario) is a former long-distance runner. He represented Canada at the 1956 and 1960 Summer Olympics. As a resident of Calgary, Alberta he won the silver medal in the men's 10,000 metres event at the 1959 Pan American Games, and the bronze in the 5,000 metres.

Kyle ran track while at student at the University of Michigan.

References
 Canadian Olympic Committee

1932 births
Living people
Athletes from Toronto
Canadian male long-distance runners
Michigan Wolverines men's track and field athletes
Athletes (track and field) at the 1954 British Empire and Commonwealth Games
Athletes (track and field) at the 1956 Summer Olympics
Athletes (track and field) at the 1959 Pan American Games
Athletes (track and field) at the 1960 Summer Olympics
Athletes (track and field) at the 1963 Pan American Games
Olympic track and field athletes of Canada
Pan American Games silver medalists for Canada
Pan American Games bronze medalists for Canada
Pan American Games medalists in athletics (track and field)
Medalists at the 1959 Pan American Games
Commonwealth Games competitors for Canada